Goran Dasović (born 31 August 1975) is a Croatian retired football player.

Club career
Born in Brčko, SR Bosnia and Herzegovina, SFR Yugoslavia, he started his career playing in Serbia in the youth team of FK Vojvodina, and in 1996 moved to Croatia where he became senior and represented a number of clubs, namely NK Varteks, NK Čakovec and NK Zagreb before moving to Slovenia to join NK Olimpija Ljubljana. Leaving for Russia, he would go on to play four seasons with FC Fakel-Voronezh Voronezh. In 2005, he retired, but in 2007, he accepted an offer to come-back and signed with Austrian side SAK Klagenfurt. He would also play for another Austrian club, SVG Bleiburg, before returning to Croatia to play with NK HAŠK and NK Maksimir.

References

External sources
 Profile at Playerhistory
 Playing career at NK Maksimir official site 
 Stats from HNL at 1hnl.net
 Stats from Slovenia at PrvaLiga
 Dasovich Goran at footballfacts.ru

1975 births
Living people
People from Brčko District
Croats of Bosnia and Herzegovina
Association football forwards
Croatian footballers
NK Varaždin players
NK Čakovec players
NK Zagreb players
NK Olimpija Ljubljana (1945–2005) players
FC St. Veit players
FC Fakel Voronezh players
SAK Klagenfurt players
SVG Bleiburg players
NK HAŠK players
NK Maksimir players
Croatian Football League players
First Football League (Croatia) players
Slovenian PrvaLiga players
Austrian Landesliga players
Russian First League players
Austrian Regionalliga players
Croatian expatriate footballers
Expatriate footballers in Slovenia
Croatian expatriate sportspeople in Slovenia
Expatriate footballers in Austria
Croatian expatriate sportspeople in Austria
Expatriate footballers in Russia
Croatian expatriate sportspeople in Russia